Adam Coleman (born 7 October 1991) is an Australian rugby union player living in England who plays lock for London Irish in the Gallagher Premiership.

Career
Coleman attended New Town High School in Hobart Tasmania. He represented Tasmania in under 14s, 16s and 18s. Coleman played under 18s at the national championships and was then selected in the combined states team that lost to Queensland in the final of the division one championship. Coleman was spotted by the ACT Brumbies academy and moved to Canberra in 2010. In 2011 Coleman is selected in the national academy and moves to Sydney to sign with Shute Shield team Parramatta Two Blues.

The encounter took place during the 2013 British & Irish Lions tour to Australia and the Watatahs were ravaged by international call-ups. Nonetheless, they were able to triumph 28–13 with Coleman debuting as a 70th-minute substitute for Will Skelton.

He made no further appearances that season, and moved west for 2014 and was named as a member of the Force's extended playing squad.

Coleman made his starting debut for the Western Force on Good Friday 18 April 2014 at AAMI Park against the Melbourne Rebels.

International
In 2016, Coleman was named in the Wallabies preliminary 39-man squad for the 2016 series against England. He made his debut as a replacement in the third test.

Personal life
Coleman is of Tongan descent and is the son of former Tongan rugby captain Pau'u Lolohea-Afeaki and first cousin of former Wallaby Rodney Blake.  Coleman is also cousins with former Hurricane Inoke Afeaki whom also captained Tonga, New Zealand All Black Ben Afeaki and Australian women's basketball player Eva Afeaki.

Super Rugby statistics

References

1991 births
Living people
Australia international rugby union players
Australian expatriate rugby union players
Australian sportspeople of Tongan descent
Australian rugby union players
Australian expatriate sportspeople in England
Expatriate rugby union players in England
London Irish players
Melbourne Rebels players
New South Wales Waratahs players
Perth Spirit players
Rugby union locks
Rugby union players from Hobart
Western Force players